Robert Nichol Wilson, known as R. N. Wilson, was a unionist politician in Northern Ireland.

Wilson studied at Malvern College and served in the Royal Artillery during World War II.  After the war, he became a director of a textile company and joined the Ulster Unionist Party.  He was elected in the 1945 Northern Ireland general election in Mid Antrim, holding the seat until he retired in 1953 without ever facing an opponent.  From 1948 to 1950, he was the Chairman of Ways and Means and Deputy Speaker of the Northern Ireland House of Commons.

References

Year of birth missing
Possibly living people
People educated at Malvern College
Royal Artillery soldiers
Members of the House of Commons of Northern Ireland 1945–1949
Members of the House of Commons of Northern Ireland 1949–1953
Ulster Unionist Party members of the House of Commons of Northern Ireland
Members of the House of Commons of Northern Ireland for County Antrim constituencies